A permanent wave, also known as a perm, is a hairstyle produced by setting the hair in waves or curls and then treating it with chemicals so that it lasts.

Permanent wave or Permanent Wave may also refer to:
 Permanent Wave (album), a 1980 John Hartford album with Douglas and Rodney Dillard
 Permanent Wave (film), a 1929 animated film
 Permanent Wave (short film), a 1986 short film 
 "Permanent Wave", an episode of season 4 of the TV show Quantum Leap
 Permanent Waves, a 1980 album by the Canadian rock band Rush
 Standing wave, a wave which oscillates in time but whose peak amplitude profile does not move in space